Antun Vakanović (21 January 1808 – 24 March 1894) was a politician from Croatia.  He served as acting ban of Croatia from 17 February 1872 until 20 September 1873.

References

External links
 List of Croatian bans at Rulers.org

1808 births
1894 deaths
Bans of Croatia